KPS Kielce – was a professional men's volleyball club based in Kielce in southeastern Poland, founded in 2007 under the name Fart Kielce. From 2010 to 2018, they competed in the Polish PlusLiga. The club was dissolved in 2019.

Former names

References

Polish volleyball clubs
Sport in Kielce
Volleyball clubs established in 2007
2007 establishments in Poland